Olga Casares Pearson (1896 – 1980) was an Argentine actress of the 1940s and 1950s considered the Golden Age of Argentine Cinema. She first appeared in film in 1929 but it wasn't until ten years later that her career took off in Argentine cinema.

She  appeared in over 20 films appearing in films such as Adán y la serpiente in 1946 alongside actors such as Olga Zubarry and Alberto de Mendoza.

Filmography

1929: Corazón ante la ley
1939: La intrusa
1943: Casa de muñecas
1944: Mi novia es un fantasma
1944: 24 horas en la vida de una mujer
1944: Nuestra Natacha
1945: Bluebeard's Six Mothers-in-Law
1945: Siete mujeres
1945: Llegó la niña Ramona
1946: Adán y la serpiente
1947: Los hijos del otro
1947: El hombre que amé
1948: María de los Ángeles
1949: La otra y yo
1950: Esposa último modelo
1951: Con la música en el alma
1954: Valparaiso Express
1956: Surcos en el mar
1957: Operación Antartida

References

External links
 

1896 births
1980 deaths
Argentine film actresses
Argentine people of British descent
Place of birth unknown
Date of birth unknown